Aircraft performance refers to the ability of an aircraft to accomplish certain useful things. It is an important consideration when designing and testing aircraft, to ensure the aircraft can be operated in an efficient and economic manner. There are typically trade-offs involved, for example an aircraft optimised for cruise performance will not necessarily be optimised for the climb. Adaptive compliant wings and variable-sweep wings are technologies aimed at improving performance during the different stages of flight.

The subject of aircraft performance includes aircraft speed, ceiling, range and fuel efficiency, take-off distance required, and climb rate. It also includes aircraft controllability speeds.

Aircraft manufacturers will publish performance data in an aircraft flight manual, concerning the behaviour of the aircraft under various circumstances, such as different speeds, weights, and air temperatures, pressures, & densities. Performance data is information pertaining to takeoff, climb, range, endurance, descent, and landing.

Aircraft performance is affected by atmospheric conditions. Climb performance will be reduced in hot and high conditions, as well as in humid conditions. Higher temperatures and humidities, and lower pressures reduce air density.

See also

 Aircraft engine performance
 Jet engine performance
 Takeoff
 Landing
 Landing performance
 Ceiling (aeronautics)
 Flight envelope
 Hot and high
 Drag curve
 Wing loading
 V speeds

References

External links
 Eurocontrol performance database
 MIT lecture on aircraft performance